Adamovka is the name of several localities in Russia:
 Adamovka, Republic of Bashkortostan, a village in Truntaishevsky Selsoviet of Alsheyevsky District of the Republic of Bashkortostan
 Adamovka, Adamovsky District, Orenburg Oblast, a settlement in Adamovsky Settlement Council of Adamovsky District of Orenburg Oblast
 , a village in Adamovsky Selsoviet of Perevolotsky District of Orenburg Oblast

See also 
 Adamovsky (disambiguation)